Martin Burkert (born 13 March 1957) is an Austrian sports shooter. He competed in the mixed skeet event at the 1984 Summer Olympics.

References

External links
 

1957 births
Living people
Austrian male sport shooters
Olympic shooters of Austria
Shooters at the 1984 Summer Olympics
Place of birth missing (living people)
20th-century Austrian people